Cirrula austrina is a species of shore flies in the family Ephydridae.

Distribution
United States, Mexico, Bermuda.

References

Ephydridae
Insects described in 1900
Taxa named by Daniel William Coquillett
Diptera of North America